Sayed Moawad Mohamed Abdelwahed (born 25 May 1979) is an Egyptian retired professional footballer who played as a left-back.

Moawad represented Al Ahly in FIFA Club World Cup three times in 2008, 2012 and 2014. He had a four-month spell with Trabzonspor in the Turkish Super Lig during 2008.

Moawad made his international debut on 25 August 2000 in a friendly match against Kenya. He was a member of Egypt national football team which won the 2008 Africa Cup of Nations and 2010 Africa Cup of Nations. He also represented Egypt at 2009 FIFA Confederations Cup.

References

External links
 

1979 births
Living people
Egyptian footballers
Egypt international footballers
2009 FIFA Confederations Cup players
2008 Africa Cup of Nations players
2010 Africa Cup of Nations players
Association football defenders
Trabzonspor footballers
Süper Lig players
Expatriate footballers in Turkey
Egyptian expatriate footballers
People from Faiyum
Egyptian expatriate sportspeople in Turkey
Ismaily SC players
Egyptian Premier League players
Al Ahly SC players
Al Aluminium SC players